Grayford is an unincorporated community in Vernon Township, Jennings County, Indiana.

The first post office in Grayford was called Butler's Switch. It was established in 1875, and was renamed Grayford in 1889. The post office closed in 1922.

Geography

References

Unincorporated communities in Jennings County, Indiana
Unincorporated communities in Indiana